Kaministiquia is a community in the Canadian province of Ontario, located in the Thunder Bay District on Highway 102 approximately 30 kilometres west of Thunder Bay. A designated place served by a local services board, Kaministiquia had a population of 587 in the Canada 2006 Census.

Kaministiquia is located at the convergence of the Dog and Mattawan Rivers. It was formerly served by the Grand Trunk Pacific Railway's Lake Superior branch, but the line near Kaministiquia has been abandoned.

Demographics 

References

Communities in Thunder Bay District
Designated places in Ontario
Local services boards in Ontario